Acacia acoma is a shrub belonging to the genus Acacia and the subgenus Phyllodineae. It is native to an area in the Great Southern and Goldfields-Esperance regions of Western Australia.

It blooms from August to September and produces yellow flowers.

See also
 List of Acacia species

References

acoma
Acacias of Western Australia
Plants described in 1999
Taxa named by Bruce Maslin